Green Spring is a home rule-class city in Jefferson County, Kentucky, United States. The population was 715 at the 2010 census.

It was formally incorporated by the state assembly in 1974.

Geography
Green Spring is located in northern Jefferson County at  (38.316962, -85.614420). It is bordered to the north by Prospect and on all other sides by consolidated Louisville/Jefferson County. Interstate 265 (Gene Snyder Freeway) forms the northern border of the city.

Demographics

As of the census of 2000, there were 759 people, 255 households, and 239 families residing in the city. The racial makeup of the city was 93.41% White, 3.43% African American, 2.37% Asian, and 0.79% from two or more races. Hispanic or Latino of any race were 0.79% of the population.

There were 255 households, out of which 41.6% had children under the age of 18 living with them, 87.1% were married couples living together, 6.3% had a female householder with no husband present, and 5.9% were non-families. 4.3% of all households were made up of individuals, and 1.2% had someone living alone who was 65 years of age or older. The average household size was 2.98 and the average family size was 3.08.

In the city, the population was spread out, with 27.5% under the age of 18, 4.6% from 18 to 24, 21.3% from 25 to 44, 39.7% from 45 to 64, and 6.9% who were 65 years of age or older. The median age was 43 years. For every 100 females, there were 91.7 males. For every 100 females age 18 and over, there were 97.8 males.

The median income for a household in the city was $100,846, and the median income for a family was $101,499. Males had a median income of $72,000 versus $36,563 for females. The per capita income for the city was $37,458. None of the families and 0.1% of the population were living below the poverty line, including no under eighteens and none of those over 64.

References

External links
City of Green Spring official website

Cities in Jefferson County, Kentucky
Cities in Kentucky
Populated places established in 1974
1974 establishments in Kentucky